The 2009–10 Toronto Maple Leafs season is the franchise's 93rd, and their 83rd as the Maple Leafs. The Leafs had not qualified for the Stanley Cup playoffs since the 2003–04 season, and began the regular season with its worst start in franchise history by going winless in the first eight games.

Team business 
The team moved to a new practice facility, the MasterCard Centre, from their former practice facility, the Lakeshore Lions Arena. Built next door to the old arena, the new facility has four ice sheets, allowing the Maple Leafs and their farm team the Toronto Marlies to practice simultaneously on separate sheets.

Off-season 
At the 2009 NHL Entry Draft, the Maple Leafs chose centre Nazem Kadri with their first round pick, seventh overall.

In free agency, the Maple Leafs signed two defencemen of note – Mike Komisarek of the Montreal Canadiens and Francois Beauchemin of the Anaheim Ducks, signing both to multiple-year deals. At the same time, defenceman Pavel Kubina was traded to the Atlanta Thrashers for fellow defenceman Garnet Exelby. The Leafs also signed free agents Colton Orr and Tim Brent.

After extensive talks, the Leafs were able to sign highly regarded Swedish free agent goaltender Jonas Gustavsson, who was considering offers from several NHL teams.

The Leafs dealt for Boston Bruins' forward Phil Kessel, trading two first round draft picks and a second round draft pick. Kessel started the season on the injured list as he was recovering from an off-season shoulder surgery.

Pre-season

Regular season 
The Leafs got off to a slow start to the NHL season, with a record of 0–7–1, the worst start for the Leafs since the NHL formed in 1917.  Additionally, the Leafs surrendered the first goal to their opposition in each of their first 11 games, and 17 of their first 19 games.

The Leafs struggled on the power play during the regular season, finishing 30th in power-play percentage, at just 13.97% (44 for 315). They also struggled on the penalty kill, allowing the most power-play goals in the League, with 73, and having the lowest penalty-kill percentage, at 74.65%.

Divisional standings

Conference standings

Game log 

|- align="center" bgcolor="ffffcc"
| 1 || October 1 || Montreal Canadiens || 3–4 (OT) || Air Canada Centre || 19,617 || 0–0–1 || 1
|- align="center" bgcolor="ffbbbb"
| 2 || October 3 || @ Washington Capitals || 4–6  || Verizon Center || 18,277  || 0–1–1 || 1
|- align="center" bgcolor="ffbbbb"
| 3 || October 6 || Ottawa Senators || 1–2 || Air Canada Centre || 18,830 || 0–2–1  || 1
|- align="center" bgcolor="ffbbbb"
| 4 || October 10 || Pittsburgh Penguins || 2–5 || Air Canada Centre || 19,374 || 0–3–1 || 1
|- align="center" bgcolor="ffbbbb"
| 5 || October 12 || @ New York Rangers || 2–7 || Madison Square Garden || 18,200 || 0–4–1 || 1
|- align="center" bgcolor="ffbbbb"
| 6 || October 13 || Colorado Avalanche || 1–4 || Air Canada Centre || 19,148 || 0–5–1 || 1
|- align="center" bgcolor="ffbbbb"
| 7 || October 17 || New York Rangers || 1–4 || Air Canada Centre || 19,295 || 0–6–1 || 1
|- align="center" bgcolor="ffbbbb"
| 8 || October 24 || @ Vancouver Canucks || 1–3 || GM Place || 18,810  || 0–7–1 || 1
|- align="center" bgcolor="#ccffcc"
| 9 || October 26 || @ Anaheim Ducks || 6–3 || Honda Center || 14,291 || 1–7–1 || 3
|- align="center" bgcolor="ffffcc"
| 10 || October 28 || @ Dallas Stars || 3–4 (OT) || American Airlines Center || 16,302 || 1–7–2 || 4
|- align="center" bgcolor="ffffcc"
| 11 || October 30 || @ Buffalo Sabres || 2–3 (OT) || HSBC Arena || 18,300 || 1–7–3 || 5
|- align="center" bgcolor="ffffcc"
| 12 || October 31 || @ Montreal Canadiens || 4–5 (SO)  || Bell Centre || 21,273 || 1–7–4 || 6
|-

|- align="center" bgcolor="ffffcc"
| 13 || November 3 || Tampa Bay Lightning || 1–2 (OT) || Air Canada Centre || 19,301 || 1–7–5 || 7
|- align="center" bgcolor="#ccffcc"
| 14 || November 6 || @ Carolina Hurricanes || 3–2 || RBC Center || 14,164 || 2–7–5 || 9
|- align="center" bgcolor="#ccffcc"
| 15 || November 7 † || Detroit Red Wings || 5–1 || Air Canada Centre || 19,303 || 3–7–5 || 11
|- align="center" bgcolor="#ffbbbb"
| 16 || November 10 || Minnesota Wild || 2–5 || Air Canada Centre || 19,063 || 3–8–5 || 11
|- align="center" bgcolor="#ffbbbb"
| 17 || November 13 || @ Chicago Blackhawks || 2–3 || United Center || 21,036 || 3–9–5 || 11
|- align="center" bgcolor="#FFBBBB"
| 18 || November 14 || Calgary Flames || 2–5 || Air Canada Centre || 19,316 || 3–10–5 || 11
|- align="center" bgcolor="#ffbbbb"
| 19 || November 17 || @ Ottawa Senators || 2–3 || Scotiabank Place || 17,406 || 3–11–5 || 11
|- align="center" bgcolor="ffffcc"
| 20 || November 19 || @ Carolina Hurricanes || 5–6 (SO) || RBC Centre || 13,502  || 3–11–6 || 12
|- align="center" bgcolor="ccffcc"
| 21 || November 21 || Washington Capitals || 2–1 (SO) || Air Canada Centre || 19,455 || 4–11–6 || 14
|- align="center" bgcolor="ffffcc"
| 22 || November 23 || New York Islanders || 3–4 (OT) || Air Canada Centre || 19,263 || 4–11–7 || 15
|- align="center" bgcolor="#ccffcc"
| 23 || November 25 || @ Tampa Bay Lightning || 4–3  || St. Pete Times Forum || 15,333 || 5–11–7  || 17
|- align="center" bgcolor="#ccffcc"
| 24 || November 27 || @ Florida Panthers || 6–4 || BankAtlantic Center || 16,101 || 6–11–7 || 19
|- align="center" bgcolor="ffbbbb"
| 25 || November 30 || Buffalo Sabres || 0–3  || Air Canada Centre || 19,110 || 6–12–7  || 19
|-

|- align="center" bgcolor="#ccffcc"
| 26 || December 1 || @ Montreal Canadiens || 3–0 || Bell Centre || 21,273 || 7–12–7 || 21
|- align="center" bgcolor="#ccffcc"
| 27 || December 3 || @ Columbus Blue Jackets || 6–3 || Nationwide Arena || 13,825 || 8–12–7 || 23
|- align="center" bgcolor="ffbbbb"
| 28 || December 5 || @ Boston Bruins || 2–7 || TD Garden || 17,565 || 8–13–7 || 23
|- align="center" bgcolor="#ccffcc"
| 29 || December 7 || Atlanta Thrashers || 5–2 || Air Canada Centre || 19,050 || 9–13–7 || 25
|- align="center" bgcolor="#ccffcc"
| 30 || December 9 || New York Islanders || 3–2 || Air Canada Centre || 19,102 || 10–13–7 || 27
|- align="center" bgcolor="ffbbbb"
| 31 || December 10 || @ Boston Bruins || 2–5 || TD Garden || 17,565 || 10–14–7 || 27
|- align="center" bgcolor="#ccffcc"
| 32 || December 12 || Washington Capitals || 6–3  || Air Canada Centre || 19,316 || 11–14–7 || 29
|- align="center" bgcolor="#ccffcc"
| 33 || December 14 || Ottawa Senators || 3–2 || Air Canada Centre || 19,315 || 12–14–7 || 31
|- align="center" bgcolor="ffbbbb"
| 34 || December 16 || Phoenix Coyotes || 3–6 || Air Canada Centre || 19,088 || 12–15–7 || 31
|- align="center" bgcolor="ffbbbb"
| 35 || December 18 || @ Buffalo Sabres || 2–5 || HSBC Arena || 18,159 || 12–16–7 || 31
|- align="center" bgcolor="#ccffcc"
| 36 || December 19 || Boston Bruins || 2–0 || Air Canada Centre || 19,101 || 13–16–7 || 33
|- align="center" bgcolor="ffffcc"
| 37 || December 21 || Buffalo Sabres || 2–3 (OT) || Air Canada Centre || 19,235 || 13–16–8 || 34
|- align="center" bgcolor="ffbbbb"
| 38 || December 23 || @ New York Islanders || 1–3 || Nassau Veterans Memorial Coliseum ||10,865  || 13–17–8 || 34
|- align="center" bgcolor="ffffcc"
| 39 || December 26 || Montreal Canadiens || 2–3 (OT)  || Air Canada Centre || 19,250 || 13–17–9  || 35
|- align="center" bgcolor="#ccffcc"
| 40 || December 27 || @ Pittsburgh Penguins || 4–3  || Mellon Arena || 17,132 || 14–17–9  || 37
|- align="center" bgcolor="ffbbbb"
| 41 || December 30 || @ Edmonton Oilers || 1–3 || Rexall Place || 16,839 || 14–18–9  || 37
|-

|- align="center" bgcolor="ffbbbb"
| 42 || January 2 || @ Calgary Flames || 1–3 || Pengrowth Saddledome || 19,289 || 14–19–9 || 37
|- align="center" bgcolor="#ccffcc"
| 43 || January 5 || Florida Panthers || 3–2  || Air Canada Centre || 18,984 || 15–19–9  || 39
|- align="center" bgcolor="ffbbbb"
| 44 || January 6 || @ Philadelphia Flyers || 2–6  || Wachovia Center || 19,617 || 15–20–9 || 39
|- align="center" bgcolor="ffbbbb"
| 45 || January 8 || @ Buffalo Sabres || 2–3 || HSBC Arena || 18,690 || 15–21–9 || 39
|- align="center" bgcolor="ffbbbb"
| 46 || January 9 || Pittsburgh Penguins || 1–4 || Air Canada Centre || 19,567 || 15–22–9  || 39
|- align="center" bgcolor="ffbbbb"
| 47 || January 12 || Carolina Hurricanes || 2–4  || Air Canada Centre || 19,120 || 15–23–9  || 39
|- align="center" bgcolor="#ccffcc"
| 48 || January 14 || Philadelphia Flyers || 4–0 || Air Canada Centre || 19,370 || 16–23–9  || 41
|- align="center" bgcolor="ffbbbb"
| 49 || January 15 || @ Washington Capitals || 1–6  || Verizon Center || 18,277 || 16–24–9 || 41
|- align="center" bgcolor="#ccffcc"
| 50 || January 18 || @ Nashville Predators || 4–3 || Sommet Center || 16,501 || 17–24–9 || 43
|- align="center" bgcolor="ffbbbb"
| 51 || January 19 || @ Atlanta Thrashers || 3–4  || Philips Arena || 10,208 || 17–25–9  || 43
|- align="center" bgcolor="ffffcc"
| 52 || January 21 || @ Tampa Bay Lightning || 2–3 (OT) || St. Pete Times Forum || 13,691 || 17–25–10  || 44
|- align="center" bgcolor="#ffbbbb"
| 53 || January 23 || @ Florida Panthers || 0–2 || BankAtlantic Center || 18,087 || 17–26–10 || 44
|- align="center" bgcolor="#ffbbbb"
| 54 || January 26 || Los Angeles Kings || 3–5  || Air Canada Centre || 19,322 || 17–27–10  || 44
|- align="center" bgcolor="ffffcc"
| 55 || January 29 || @ New Jersey Devils || 4–5 (OT)  || Prudential Center || 15,536 || 17–27–11  || 45
|- align="center" bgcolor="#ffbbbb"
| 56 || January 30 || Vancouver Canucks || 3–5 || Air Canada Centre || 19,534 || 17–28–11 || 45
|-

|- align="center" bgcolor="#ccffcc"
| 57 || February 2 || New Jersey Devils || 3–0  || Air Canada Centre || 19,326 || 18–28–11  || 47
|- align="center" bgcolor="#ffbbbb"
| 58 || February 5 || @ New Jersey Devils || 3–4 || Prudential Center || 15,204 || 18–29–11 || 47
|- align="center" bgcolor="#ccffcc"
| 59 || February 6 || Ottawa Senators || 5–0 || Air Canada Centre || 19,426 || 19–29–11 || 49
|- align="center" bgcolor="#ffbbbb"
| 60 || February 8 || San Jose Sharks || 2–3  || Air Canada Centre || 19,460 || 19–30–11  || 49
|- align="center" bgcolor="#ffbbbb"
| 61 || February 12 || @ St. Louis Blues || 0–4  || Scottrade Center || 19,150 ||  19–31–11 || 49
|-

|- align="center" bgcolor="#ffbbbb"
| 62 || March 2 || Carolina Hurricanes || 1–5 || Air Canada Centre || 19,096 || 19–32–11 || 49
|- align="center" bgcolor="ffffcc"
| 63 || March 4 || @ Boston Bruins || 2–3 (SO) || TD Garden || 17,565 || 19–32–12  || 50
|- align="center" bgcolor="#ccffcc"
| 64 || March 6 || @ Ottawa Senators || 2–1 (SO) || Scotiabank Place || 20,036 || 20–32–12  || 52
|- align="center" bgcolor="#ffbbbb"
| 65 || March 7 || @ Philadelphia Flyers || 1–3 || Wachovia Center || 19,632 || 20–33–12 || 52
|- align="center" bgcolor="#ccffcc"
| 66 || March 9 || Boston Bruins || 4–3 (OT) || Air Canada Centre || 19,499 || 21–33–12  || 54
|- align="center" bgcolor="#ccffcc"
| 67 || March 11 || Tampa Bay Lightning || 4–3 (OT) || Air Canada Centre || 19,110 || 22–33–12  || 56
|- align="center" bgcolor="#ccffcc"
| 68 || March 13 || Edmonton Oilers || 6–4 || Air Canada Centre || 19,243 || 23–33–12 || 58
|- align="center" bgcolor="#ffbbbb"
| 69 || March 14 || @ New York Islanders || 1–4  || Nassau Veterans Memorial Coliseum || 12,804 || 23–34–12  || 58
|- align="center" bgcolor="#ccffcc"
| 70 || March 16 || @ Ottawa Senators || 4–1 || Scotiabank Place || 20,405 || 24–34–12 || 60
|- align="center" bgcolor="#ccffcc"
| 71 || March 18 || New Jersey Devils || 2–1 (SO) || Air Canada Centre || 19,183 || 25–34–12 || 62
|- align="center" bgcolor="#ccffcc"
| 72 || March 20 || Montreal Canadiens || 3–2 (SO) || Air Canada Centre || 19,538 || 26–34–12 || 64
|- align="center" bgcolor="#ffbbbb"
| 73 || March 23 || Florida Panthers || 1–4  || Air Canada Centre || 19,158 || 26–35–12  || 64
|- align="center" bgcolor="#ccffcc"
| 74 || March 25 || @ Atlanta Thrashers || 2–1 (OT)  || Philips Arena || 14,148 || 27–35–12  || 66
|- align="center" bgcolor="#ccffcc"
| 75 || March 27 || New York Rangers || 3–2 (OT) || Air Canada Centre || 19,405 || 28–35–12  || 68
|- align="center" bgcolor="ffffcc"
| 76 || March 28 || @ Pittsburgh Penguins || 4–5 (SO) || Mellon Arena || 17,104 || 28–35–13 || 69
|- align="center" bgcolor="#ffbbbb"
| 77 || March 30 || Atlanta Thrashers || 2–3  || Air Canada Centre || 19,079 || 28–36–13  || 69
|-

|- align="center" bgcolor="#ccffcc"
| 78 || April 1 || Buffalo Sabres || 4–2 || Air Canada Centre || 19,090 || 29–36–13 || 71
|- align="center" bgcolor="#ffc"
| 79 || April 3 || Boston Bruins || 1–2 (OT) || Air Canada Centre || 19,273 || 29–36–14 || 72
|- align="center" bgcolor="ffbbbb"
| 80 || April 6 || Philadelphia Flyers || 0–2 || Air Canada Centre || 19,366 || 29–37–14 || 72
|- align="center" bgcolor="ffbbbb"
| 81 || April 7 || @ New York Rangers || 1–5 || Madison Square Garden || 18,200 || 29–38–14 || 72
|- align="center" bgcolor="#ccffcc"
| 82 || April 10 || @ Montreal Canadiens || 4–3 (OT)  || Bell Centre || 21,273 || 30–38–14  || 74
|-

|-
| † Hockey Hall of Fame Game
|-
| Schedule

Overtime statistics

Record based on Toronto (or opposition) scoring first goal(s)
updated to game played April 10, 2010

 Toronto's score listed first

Playoffs 

The Toronto Maple Leafs were trying to achieve their first qualification since the 2003–04 NHL season, however they were mathematically eliminated after their 77th game.  They were the first team eliminated in the Eastern Conference.  Currently, only the Florida Panthers have failed to qualify for the playoffs for more consecutive years.

Player statistics
Final stats

Skaters

Goaltenders

†Denotes player spent time with another team before joining Maple Leafs. Stats reflect time with Maple Leafs only.
‡Traded mid-season.
Bold/italics denotes franchise record.

Awards and records

Records

Milestones

Awards

Transactions 
The Maple Leafs have been involved in the following transactions during the 2009–10 season.

Trades 

|}

Free agents acquired

Free agents lost

Claimed via waivers

Lost via waivers

Lost via retirement

Player signings

Draft picks 

Toronto's picks at the 2009 NHL Entry Draft in Montreal, Quebec.

See also 
 2009–10 NHL season

Farm teams 
 The Maple Leafs continue their affiliation with the Toronto Marlies of the American Hockey League and the Reading Royals of the ECHL.

References

External links 
 2009–10 Toronto Maple Leafs season at Official Site
 2009–10 Toronto Maple Leafs season at ESPN
 2009–10 Toronto Maple Leafs season at Hockey Reference

Toronto Maple Leafs seasons
Toronto Maple Leafs season, 2009-10
Tor